Posterior auricular can refer to:
 Posterior auricular artery
 Posterior auricular muscle
 Posterior auricular vein